Deshamanya R. K. W. Goonesekera, PC (born May 8, 1928) is a Sri Lankan lawyer and academic. He was the Chancellor of the University of Peradeniya, a Professor and Professor of Law, Ahmadu Bello University and Principal of the Sri Lanka Law College. He specialises in Public Law, Constitutional Law and Fundamental Rights.

Educated at Royal College Colombo, he graduated with an LL.B. from the University of Ceylon in 1954, he was called to bar as an Advocate of the Supreme Court of Ceylon. In 1956 he gained a BCL from the University of Oxford.

Goonesekera served as a senior lecturer of Law University of Ceylon and thereafter served as Principal of Sri Lanka Law College from 1966 to 1974. He became a Professor in Law at Ahmadu Bello University. A founder member of the Civil Rights Movement, Prof Goonesekera headed the Nadesan Centre for Human Rights through Law and became Deputy President of the Bar Council in 1993. He is also a member of the Legal Aid Commission and the Law Commission. He has been appointed a President's Counsel and been awarded the title Deshamanya by the government of Sri Lanka.

References

Sri Lankan academic administrators
Sinhalese lawyers
Alumni of Royal College, Colombo
Academic staff of the University of Peradeniya
Academic staff of Ahmadu Bello University
Alumni of the University of Ceylon
Alumni of the University of Oxford
Principals of the Sri Lanka Law College
President's Counsels (Sri Lanka)
Deshamanya
1928 births
Living people